Emily Petricola  (born 24 April 1980) is an Australian Paralympic cyclist. She is a world record holder and gold medallist at the 2019 UCI Para-cycling Track World Championships and the 2020 Tokyo Paralympics.

Personal
In 2007 at the age of 27, Petricola was diagnosed with multiple sclerosis. She used to teach English in a private school. She is a qualified English and humanities teacher.

Cycling
Petricola is classified as a C4  cyclist. In her first major international competition  at the 2018 UCI Para-cycling Track World Championships in Rio de Janeiro, Brazil, she won the silver medal in Women's Pursuit C4 and the bronze medal in the Women's 500m Time Trial. In the Women's Pursuit C4 heats she set a world record time of 3:54.501.

In 2019, she relocated  from Melbourne to the Australian Cycling Team headquarters in Adelaide. At the 2019 UCI Para-cycling Track World Championships in Apeldoorn, Netherlands, she won the gold medal in the Women's Pursuit C4. After breaking the world record in qualifying, in the final she overtook her opponent to win the gold. She also won the bronze medal in the Women's Scratch Race C4.

At the 2019 UCI Para-cycling Road World Championships, Emmen, Netherlands, she won the gold medal in the  Women's Time Trial C4 and finished fifth in the  Women's Road Race C4.

At the 2020 UCI Para-cycling Track World Championships, Milton, Ontario, she won three gold medals - Women's Individual Pursuit C4, Women's Omnium C4 and Women's Scratch Race C4.

Petricola in her first Paralympic Games in 2020Tokyo, won the Women's 3000m Individual Pursuit C4, setting a world record time of 3:38.061 in the qualifying for the gold medal race. She won the silver medal in the Women's Road Time Trial C4 and finished tenth in the Women's Road Race C4–5.

Petricola won the silver medal in the Women's Time Trial C4 and did not finish the Women's Road Race C4 at 2022 UCI Para-cycling Road World Championships in Baie-Comeau.

At the 2022 UCI Para-cycling Track World Championships in  Saint-Quentin-en-Yvelines, France, she won three gold medals - Women's Pursuit C4, Women's Scratch Race C4 and Women's Omnium C4.

Recognition
2022 – Medal of the Order of Australia for service to sport as a gold medallist at the Tokyo Paralympic Games 2020 
2022 - AusCycling - Women’s Track Para-cyclist of the Year
2022 - Australian Institute of Sport - Female Para-athlete of The Year

References

External links 

Australian Cycling Team Profile
Victorian Institute of Sport Profile

1980 births
Living people
Paralympic cyclists of Australia
Australian female cyclists
People with multiple sclerosis
Cyclists at the 2020 Summer Paralympics
Medalists at the 2020 Summer Paralympics
Paralympic gold medalists for Australia
Paralympic silver medalists for Australia
Recipients of the Medal of the Order of Australia
20th-century Australian women
21st-century Australian women